Stéphane Biakolo (born 8 March 1982) is a French former professional footballer who played as a forward.

Career
In 2000, at the age of 18, Biakolo joined Serie A side Inter from Ligue 1 club Montpellier without having made a first team appearance for the latter. A year later, he joined Sporting Charleroi of Belgium on a season-long loan.

He then returned to France playing in the Ligue 2 for Chamois Niortais and Le Havre AC. Following stints in the third tier with Angers SCO and Stade Lavallois he returned to youth club US Albi in 2008.

After leaving FC Martigues, Biakolo went on play for Réunion clubs US Possession, JS Saint-Pierroise, and RC Saint-Benoît.

Having spent the 2017 season at SS Saint-Louisienne, he left the club.

References

External links
 
 

1982 births
Living people
People from Échirolles
Sportspeople from Isère
French sportspeople of Cameroonian descent
French footballers
Cameroonian footballers
Footballers from Auvergne-Rhône-Alpes
Association football forwards
Belgian Pro League players
Ligue 2 players
Championnat National players
Montpellier HSC players
Inter Milan players
R. Charleroi S.C. players
Chamois Niortais F.C. players
Le Havre AC players
Angers SCO players
Stade Lavallois players
FC Martigues players
US Albi players
French expatriate footballers
French expatriate sportspeople in Italy
Expatriate footballers in Italy
French expatriate sportspeople in Belgium
Expatriate footballers in Belgium